Joshua Mellody (born 1 June 1989), professionally known as Zomboy, is an English dubstep music producer, songwriter, and DJ whose mascot is a zombie.

Biography 
Before Joshua Mellody was active under the name Zomboy, he had an Electronicore project called Place Your Bet$, under which a self-titled demo album was released in 2010.
Zomboy debuted in 2011 with the track "Organ Donor", which was released on Never Say Die Records Game Time EP. His debut EP was in top 5 of the Beatport dubstep charts for over eight weeks. At the end of the year, his music and remixes were licensed to compilations on labels like Warner and Ministry of Sound.

In 2012, he released his second EP, The Dead Symphonic EP. In March 2013, he released the single "Here to Stay" featuring Lady Chann on No Tomorrow Records. In September 2013, his Reanimated EP was released in two parts, of which Pt. 1 was released on Never Say Die Records & Pt. 2 on No Tomorrow Recordings. His debut album entitled The Outbreak on Never Say Die Records was released in August 2014.
2016 saw the release of the Neon Grave EP, featuring four tracks; remixes of these tracks were released in an EP in early 2017.

2017 also saw the release of an EP entitled Rott N' Roll Part 1 coinciding with a US tour; the remixes of this EP were released that November.

Zomboy cites influences such as Skrillex, Reso, Rusko and Bare Noize. He studied Music Production at the Academy of Contemporary Music in Guildford.

Discography 

 The Outbreak (2014)
 Resurrected (2015)

References

External links
 

Remixers
Living people
Dubstep musicians
Moombahcore musicians
English record producers
English DJs
Electronic dance music DJs
1989 births
People from Penzance